Windows Live is a discontinued brand name for a set of web services and software products developed by Microsoft as part of its software-as-a-service platform. Chief components under the brand name included web services (all of which were exposed through corresponding web applications), several computer programs that interact with the services, and specialized web services for mobile devices.

According to Microsoft, Windows Live "is a way to extend the Windows user experience". As such, Windows Vista's welcome screen provides a link to download Windows Live Messenger or to subscribe to Windows Live OneCare. Also, Windows Mail, Windows Photo Gallery and Windows Movie Maker were not offered with Windows 7 and became an exclusive part of Windows Live. Microsoft announced that Windows 8 would see Windows Live apps included right out-of-the-box, and would include built-in synchronization technologies powered by OneDrive (then SkyDrive). The Windows Live brand was phased out during August 2012, when Microsoft released Windows 8 to manufacturing. Active Windows Live services remained active but were gradually renamed. The "live.com" domain, however, continues to be used in the URLs for Outlook and OneDrive.

History
Windows Live was first announced on November 1, 2005. In its initial release, several Windows Live properties were rebranded and enhanced from Microsoft's MSN set of products and services. However, MSN still exists alongside Windows Live as a means of delivering content (as opposed to customized content and communications). In May 2012 Microsoft began renaming Windows Live services, partly in anticipation of Windows 8, which integrates many of the Windows Live products and services into the operating system.

Services

Online services
The following services were once part of Windows Live but are still online. Outlook.com and OneDrive still use the "Live" branding in the URL even though the brand name is dropped.

Mobile services

Windows Phone

My Windows Phone was a free online companion service for Windows Phone mobile devices that provided users with a free mobile phone back-up solution by wirelessly synchronizing contacts, calendar appointments, photos, and OneNote notebooks with a password-protected online portal. Users could access and manage their information stored on their Windows Phone devices via the online portal using their Microsoft account, as well as accessing a set of features for remotely ringing, locking, mapping, and erasing their lost phones. This service integrated tightly with other Windows Live services including Hotmail.com People and Calendar, and SkyDrive.

iOS

Microsoft released a Windows Live Messenger application on the iOS App Store, which allowed users on mobile devices running iOS to communicate with their contacts via the Microsoft Messenger service. In addition to the instant messaging functionalities, the application also allowed users to view their Messenger social feed, view their friend's Profiles, and integrate with Hotmail and Photos.

Feature phone
Windows Live also provided customized services specifically created for feature phones. It was offered via three channels — through Client-based (for Windows Mobile and other supported mobile devices such as Nokia phones), Web-based (for WAP or GPRS-enabled mobile web browsers), or SMS-based services.

Search services

Bing, a replacement of the search engine Live Search, was originally named Windows Live Search (and MSN Search prior to that) and was once part of the Windows Live family of services. Windows Live Search once occupied the homepage of Live.com, the domain for all Windows Live services. However, on March 21, 2007, Microsoft decided to separate its search developments from its Windows Live services family, forming part of the Live Search and Ad Platform. As part of this reorganization, the new search brand, Live Search, was consolidated with Microsoft adCenter, a part of Microsoft's Platform and Systems division. However, Microsoft recognised that there was a brand issue as the word "Live" continued to remain in the brand. As an effort to create a new identity for Microsoft's search services, on June 3, 2009, Live Search was officially rebranded as Bing.

Developer services

Live Connect is a collection of APIs and common controls that allow developers to have a deeper control and offers access to the core Windows Live services and data through open and easily accessible application programming interfaces (APIs). Live Connect is built on standard web technologies such as OAuth 2.0, Representational State Transfer (REST), and JavaScript Object Notation (JSON), and is designed to work with any technology or device. Live Connect unites the previously separate APIs of Windows Live into a single API that is based on industry standards and specifications.

Discontinued services

Software
Microsoft has released several computer programs with "Windows Live" brand, a summary of which is included below. All except Windows Live OneCare are freeware and published in a software suite called Windows Essentials (formerly Windows Live Essentials). Essentials programs are designed to integrate well with each other, within Windows, and with other Windows Live services such as OneDrive and Outlook.com. Windows Live OneCare on the other hand, was a commercial consumers utility marketed with a software as a service licensing model.

Windows Live Butterfly
The Windows Live Butterfly awards program (formerly the MSN Butterfly program) was a program whose members were given the benefit of new Microsoft software to test before the beta releases went public and they were in direct contact with the program managers for Windows Live products.

Microsoft had initiated the Windows Live Butterfly program in order to recognize the contributions made by exemplary beta testers. Prospective 'butterflies' were selected by the Windows Live product team and were nominated for a term of one year, after which they could be renominated.

The Windows Live Butterfly program was closed in June 2009.

User interface
All Windows Live websites sport a common theme. Different themes have been used on the sites with each phase of product release, called "Waves". Each Wave has a set of online services and desktop programs (Windows Essentials). The web services are labelled by each Wave, for example, Hotmail Wave 4. The programs from Windows Essentials are usually called by a year number, for example, Windows Live Messenger 2011.

Blue Vapor/Flair/Wave 1 

Most original Windows Live applications and services used a visual theme known as Blue Vapor or Flair.

Wave 2

With the public beta release of the Windows Live Wave 2 Suite, a new visual theme was released to enable the Aero transparency effect in Windows Vista.

Wave 3

Microsoft released a set of new themes for their Windows Live Wave 3 services, which allows users to customize their pages on Windows Live using a set of pre-selected background pictures. Several of these themes are dynamic and change according to the time of day and the current weather condition of the user.

Wave 4

In addition to the themes provided in Windows Live Wave 3, the release of Windows Live Wave 4 provided additional themes for users to customise their pages on Windows Live, with several dynamic themes that changes according to the time of day and weather conditions at the user's location. Several of these newly added themes are similar to wallpapers originating from Windows 7. In addition, the Windows Live Wave 4 header features a reorganised dynamic navigation menu that displays the number of the user's current online contacts and the number of unread e-mails, as well as an in-built Windows Live Web Messenger service allowing users to connect to the Microsoft Messenger service and Facebook chat service to chat with their online contacts while browsing any Windows Live properties using a web browser.

See also 
In addition to Windows Live, which is mainly aimed at individuals, Microsoft brands other properties as "Live", including:

 Xbox Live (a multiplayer gaming and content-delivery system for Xbox)
Games for Windows – Live (multiplayer gaming service for Microsoft Windows)
Office Live. Office Live merged into Windows Live during the Wave 4 update. Microsoft merged Office Live into the Windows Live team in January 2009.

References

 
Microsoft websites
MSN
Web service providers
Companies based in Palo Alto, California
Computer-related introductions in 2005
Products and services discontinued in 2012